Justin de Haas (born 1 February 2000) is a Dutch footballer who plays as a defender for Prva HNL side Lokomotiva Zagreb.

References

2000 births
Living people
Footballers from Zaanstad
Dutch footballers
Netherlands youth international footballers
Association football defenders
Eerste Divisie players
First Football League (Croatia) players
Croatian Football League players
Jong AZ players
Jong PSV players
GNK Dinamo Zagreb II players
NK Lokomotiva Zagreb players
Dutch expatriate footballers
Dutch expatriate sportspeople in Croatia
Expatriate footballers in Croatia